Valetti is a surname. Notable people with the surname include:

Giovanni Valetti (1913–1998), Italian cyclist
Rosa Valetti (1878–1937), German actress, cabaret performer, and singer

See also
79375 Valetti, main-belt asteroid
Valletti